Power, Profit and Protest: Australian Social Movements and Globalisation is a 2003 book by Verity Burgmann.

The book was originally published in 1993, and the 2003 edition is substantially expanded.  It contains a new chapter on "social movements and social change", and another on the "anti-corporate globalisation movement".  There is a new concluding chapter on globalisation as the "cancer stage of capitalism".

Cathie Jensen-Lee writes "This book provides an interesting and thoughtful analysis of several movements for change in Australian society; namely the Aboriginal movement, the women's movement, the green movement and the anti-capitalist/anti-corporate globalisation movements."

See also
 Tasmania's Wilderness Battles

References

External links
 Power, profit and protest : Australian social movements and globalisation / Verity Burgmann - Details - Trove
 Informit - Labour History - Verity Burgmann, Power, Profit and Protest : Australian Social Movements and Globalisation [Book Review] (Business Collection)
 O'Hara on Burgmann Power, profit and protest
 Fighting for the Forests. Ron Chapman (PhD) 2008, p18. (in research)
 The workers' flag is deepest green. Jeff Sparrow. Seminar, Australian National University, October 2004. (in teaching)
 David Sprigg (in social policy research)

2003 non-fiction books
2003 in the environment
Environmental non-fiction books
Australian political books
Books about globalization
Allen & Unwin books